The 1994 Minnesota Twins played in an abbreviated, strike-shortened season.  The strike overshadowed the season's accomplishments.  These included Scott Erickson's no-hitter on April 27, Chuck Knoblauch's 85-game errorless streak and league-leading 45 doubles, Kirby Puckett's 2,000th hit, and Kent Hrbek's retirement.  In 113 games, Manager Tom Kelly's team finished with a record of 53–60, for fourth place in the newly created American League Central Division.

Offseason
 November 24, 1993: Willie Banks was traded by the Twins to the Chicago Cubs for Dave Stevens and Matt Walbeck.
 February 16, 1994: Alex Cole was signed as a free agent by the Twins.
 February 21, 1994: The Twins traded a player to be named later to the Cleveland Indians for minor leaguer Shawn Bryant. The Twins completed the deal by sending Enrique Wilson to the Indians on March 24.

Regular season

On April 27 at home, Scott Erickson no-hit the Milwaukee Brewers—the Metrodome's first no-hitter—for a 6-0 win.  His is the third Twins' no-hitter, 27 years after Dean Chance no-hit the Cleveland Indians in 1967.

On May 20, the team put up 22 hits against the Boston Red Sox—not a record.  But two club records were set in the fifth inning, when eight consecutive players hit safely, and a total of ten hits were recorded in the half-inning.  The Twins won, 21-2.

The Twins' All-Star representatives were outfielder Kirby Puckett and second baseman Chuck Knoblauch.

By Friday, August 12, the Twins had compiled a 53-60 record through 113 games. They had scored 594 runs (5.26 per game) and allowed 688 runs (6.09 per game).

Throughout the strike-shortened season, the Twins pitching staff struggled and finished with a 5.68 ERA: the highest in the majors. In 1,005.0 innings pitched, they gave up 1,197 hits and 634 earned runs: the most among all 28 teams. They did, however, issue the fewest intentional walks in the Majors, with 20.

Terry Ryan was named Twins General Manager, replacing Andy MacPhail, architect of the team's 1991 world champion team.

The highest paid Twin in 1994 was Puckett at $5,300,000, followed by Aguilera at $3,260,000.

Offense
Despite the short season, Kirby Puckett managed to belt 20 home runs and drive in 112 runs, winning his sixth Silver Slugger Award.  Outfielder Shane Mack had a solid year in his last year with the Twins, batting .333.  Knoblauch and outfielder Alex Cole lit up the base paths, stealing 35 and 29 bases, respectively.  Designated hitter Dave Winfield had a mediocre year in his last season with his hometown team.  (He would play in 46 games for the Cleveland Indians in 1995 before announcing his retirement.)

Pitching
The starting rotation was not a strong one, although the starters at least started consistently every fifth day, unlike in subsequent years for the Twins.  Jim Deshaies, Kevin Tapani, Scott Erickson, Pat Mahomes, and Carlos Pulido started all but six games for the team.  Despite the no-hitter, Erickson's year was disappointing, as he posted a 5.44 ERA.  Rick Aguilera continued to be a reliable closer while the only reliable arm out of the bullpen was Kevin Campbell with an ERA of 2.92.

Defense
Matt Walbeck and Derek Parks were a strong 1-2 punch at catcher, at least defensively.  (Both had .993 fielding percentages.)  Kent Hrbek ended his career with a solid one defensively with a .997 average.  As mentioned, Knoblauch excelled defensively at this point in his career.  Scott Leius and Pat Meares were defensively average on the left side of the infield.  Puckett and Mack were strong in the outfield, while Alex Cole was average.  Pedro Muñoz also saw substantial time in the outfield.

Season standings

Record vs. opponents

Notable transactions
 March 14, 1994: Lenny Webster was traded by the Twins to the Montreal Expos as part of a conditional deal.
 June 2, 1994: 1994 Major League Baseball draft
Todd Walker was drafted by the Twins in the 1st round (8th pick).
Travis Miller was drafted by the Twins in the 1st round (34th pick).
Cleatus Davidson was drafted by the Twins in the 2nd round.
A. J. Pierzynski was drafted by the Twins in the 3rd round.
David Dellucci was drafted by the Twins in the 11th round, but did not sign.
Corey Koskie was drafted by the Twins in the 26th round.
 July 14, 1994: Larry Casian was claimed off waivers from the Twins by the Cleveland Indians.
 August 31: Dave Winfield was sold by the Twins to the Cleveland Indians.

Roster

Player stats

Batting

Starters by position
Note: Pos = Position; G = Games played; AB = At bats; H = Hits; Avg. = Batting average; HR = Home runs; RBI = Runs batted in

Other batters
Note: G = Games played; AB = At bats; H = Hits; Avg. = Batting average; HR = Home runs; RBI = Runs batted in

Pitching

Starting pitchers
Note: G = Games pitched; IP = Innings pitched; W = Wins; L = Losses; ERA = Earned run average; SO = Strikeouts

Other pitchers
Note: G = Games pitched; IP = Innings pitched; W = Wins; L = Losses; ERA = Earned run average; SO = Strikeouts

Relief pitchers
Note: G = Games pitched; W = Wins; L = Losses; SV = Saves; ERA = Earned run average; SO = Strikeouts

Other post-season awards
Calvin R. Griffith Award (Most Valuable Twin) – Kirby Puckett
Joseph W. Haynes Award (Twins Pitcher of the Year) – Kevin Tapani
Bill Boni Award (Twins Outstanding Rookie) – Matt Walbeck
Charles O. Johnson Award (Most Improved Twin) – Chuck Knoblauch
Dick Siebert Award (Upper Midwest Player of the Year) – Paul Molitor
The above awards are voted on by the Twin Cities chapter of the BBWAA
Carl R. Pohlad Award (Outstanding Community Service) – Kent Hrbek
Sherry Robertson Award (Twins Outstanding Farm System Player) – LaTroy Hawkins

Designated hitter Dave Winfield won the Roberto Clemente Award, given annually to the Major League Baseball (MLB) player who "best exemplifies the game of baseball, sportsmanship, community involvement and the individual's contribution to his team", as voted on by baseball fans and members of the media.  Rod Carew in 1977 is the only Twin to have won this award in the past.  Kirby Puckett will win it in 1996.

Farm system

References

External links
Player stats from www.baseball-reference.com
Team info from www.baseball-almanac.com
Twins history through the 1990s, from www.mlb.com
1994 Standings

Minnesota Twins seasons
Minnesota Twins season
Twins